Camp Harry J. Jones was an encampment of the United States Army.  Located near Douglas, Arizona, it was active during the Pancho Villa Expedition and World War I.

History
The United States Army established a camp near Douglas, Arizona in 1910, one of a number of camps established along the border with Mexico to provide border security during the conflicts that were part of the Mexican Revolution. The site was renamed Camp Jones in 1916, in honor of a soldier who had been accidentally shot and killed by a stray bullet while on guard duty during the Second Battle of Agua Prieta, which took place between revolutionaries and Mexican government forces across the border from Douglas.

Camp Jones was an important facility during the 1916–17 Expedition against Pancho Villa, which was commanded by John J. Pershing, with several cavalry units stationed there to provide security against incursions by Villa's forces.  The camp also served as the mobilization site for the Arizona National Guard when it was called up to take part in the Villa Expedition.

During the Villa expedition, units based at Camp Jones made extensive use of automobiles and trucks, and also employed aircraft for observation and scouting.  This use of motorized vehicles was the Army's first major effort to employ mechanized forces, and foreshadowed its transition away from horses and mules.

World War I
Camp Jones remained an important location during World War I, and was the headquarters of the Army's Arizona District.  Soldiers stationed there continued to patrol the U.S. border with Mexico to deter possible attacks by German soldiers or infiltration by German spies.

Closure
Camp Jones was closed in January 1933. Several southwestern border posts were proposed for closure as a cost savings measure during the Great Depression.  Local leaders in Douglas and state leaders in Arizona attempted to prevent the closure, but were unsuccessful.  Many of the troops then stationed at Camp Jones were transferred to nearby Fort Huachuca.  Soldiers of the 10th Cavalry Regiment salvaged buildings and other equipment, much of which was sold or moved to Fort Huachuca.  There are no existing traces of Camp Jones, and the location of the camp is now a residential area within the Douglas city limits.

Location
The camp entrance was described in a contemporary account as being at the east end of 10th Street in Douglas.  An existing map shows the camp as bounded on the west by North Washington Avenue, on the north by East 13th Street, and on the south by 1st Street.  This area corresponds roughly to the area between Calvary Cemetery in Douglas and the Douglas Municipal Airport.

Association with prominent individuals
 DeRosey Caroll Cabell, commander of the Arizona District during World War I
 James M. Gavin, assigned to the 25th Infantry Regiment at Camp Jones from 1929 to 1932
 William H. Hay, commander of the 1st Cavalry Brigade at Camp Jones from 1922 to 1924
 Charles S. Kilburn, served as a second lieutenant at Camp Jones during the beginning of his career
 John F. Madden, commander of the  19th Infantry Regiment from 1919 to 1920
 Edward McGlachlin Jr., commander of the Arizona District during World War I
 Troy H. Middleton, served with the 7th Infantry Regiment during the Second Battle of Agua Prieta
 George H. Morgan, Medal of Honor recipient, commanded Camp Jones and the Douglas sub-district of the Arizona District during World War I
 Lucian Truscott, stationed at Camp Jones as a member of the 17th Cavalry Regiment during World War I
 Leroy H. Watson, stationed at Camp Jones with the 22nd Infantry during the Pancho Villa Expedition
 John E. Woodward, stationed at Camp Jones as adjutant of the Arizona District from 1916 to 1917

References

Sources

Newspapers

Books

Magazines

Internet
 

Closed installations of the United States Army
Military history of Arizona
Forts in Arizona
History of Arizona
Arizona Territory
1910 establishments in the United States
1933 disestablishments